Maple Leaf is the seventeenth studio album by Russian pop singer Valery Leontiev. It was released in 2003. The album was re-released in 2011 by World Media Alliance.

Track listing 
 Maple Leaf (Evzirov V.- Denisov.N)
 Cheri (Evzirov V.- Denisov.N) 
Eternal Love (Garvarentz G.- Aznavour Ch.)
Michele (Ukupnik, Dobronravov- Gegelsky O.)
The Friends Are Loosing (Evzirov V.- Spalikov.G)
Rose of Cairo (Breitburg.K- Sashin.S)
Ancient People (Krutoy.I- Arkanov.A)
Reel of Film (Muratov.R- Markevich. A)
I'll Be Back (Talkov.I- Talkov.I)
Tuner (Krutoy.I- Delia.L)
Marilyn (Krutoy.I- Pelengre.V)
Summer of Apples (Evzirov V.- Denisov.N)
Sing, My Heart (Mison.A- Patrushev.S)
Green Light (Pauls.R- Zinoviev.N)
The Scene  (Evzirov V.- Suleimenov.A)
 Bonus track: Video clip "Michele"

External links 
 Official website

References

2003 albums
Valery Leontiev albums